David Greenfield may refer to:
 Dave Greenfield (1949–2020), English keyboard player with The Stranglers
 David G. Greenfield (fl. 2010s), American politician
 David Greenfield (Canadian politician) (born 1967)
 David Wayne Greenfield, ichthyologist who coined the name of the genus Allenbatrachus